Lemongrass is any plant in the genus Cymbopogon.

Lemongrass may also refer to:

 Lemongrass (music), a German music act and record label
 LemonGrass (band), a Mexican children's music group